The following is a list of media in Dayton, Ohio, United States.

Print

Daily 
The Dayton Daily News

Weekly/business 
Dayton Business Journal
Dayton City Paper
Dayton Weekly

Online 
Dayton Local
Dayton Most Metro
DaytonLocalMusic.com
Inclusion Magazine

Alternative 
Active Dayton

Collegiate 
Clarion - the student newspaper of Sinclair Community College
Flyer News - the semiweekly student newspaper at the University of Dayton
The Guardian - the weekly student newspaper at Wright State University

Television 
Nielsen Media Research ranked the 11-county Dayton television market #65 in the United States. Among the stations it includes are:

2 WDTN Dayton (NBC)
7 WHIO-TV Dayton (CBS)
16 WPTD Dayton (PBS)
22 WKEF, Dayton (ABC/Fox)
26 WBDT Springfield (The CW)
43 WKOI-TV Richmond, IN (Ion Television)*
45 WRGT-TV Dayton (MyNetworkTV)

Television stations from Cincinnati, Ohio are available with varying levels of reception.

The nationally syndicated morning talk show The Daily Buzz originated from WBDT-TV, the Acme property in Miamisburg, Ohio, before moving to its current home in Florida.

Broadcast radio

AM stations 
700 WLW Cincinnati (Talk/sports)1
910 WPFB Middletown (Catholic-EWTN)
980 WONE Dayton (Sports)
1090 WKFI Wilmington (Classic country)2
1110 WGNZ Fairborn (Gospel)2
1130 WEDI Eaton (Classic country)2
1210 WDAO Dayton (Urban contemporary)2
1290 WHIO Dayton (Talk)
1340 WIZE Springfield (Black Information Network)
1410 WING Dayton (Sports)
1500 WBZI Xenia (Classic country)2
1570 WPTW Piqua (Oldies)
1600 WULM Springfield (Radio Maria)
1 clear-channel station
2 daytime-only station

FM stations 
Asterisk (*) indicates a non-commercial (public radio/campus/educational) broadcast. Cross (†) indicates a time-share operation between the two stations.

88.1 WDPR Dayton (NPR/classical)*
88.9 WCSU-FM – Urban Contemporary
89.1 WUSO Springfield (College/variety)*
89.5 WDPS Dayton (Campus/variety)*†
89.5 WQRP Dayton (Radio Nueva Vida)*†
89.9 WLHS West Chester (Adult standards/MOR)*
90.3 WKCD Cedarville (K-Love)*
91.3 WYSO Yellow Springs (NPR/talk/variety)*
92.1 WROU-FM West Carrollton (Urban AC)
92.9 WGTZ Eaton (Adult hits)
93.7 WFCJ Miamisburg (Christian)
94.5 WYDB Englewood (Conservative talk)
94.9 WREW Fairfield (Adult contemporary)
95.3 WZLR Xenia (Classic hits)
95.7 WHIO-FM Pleasant Hill (Talk)
96.5 WFTK Lebanon (Active rock)
96.9 WYDA Troy (Air1)*
97.3 WSWO-LP Huber Heights (LPFM/oldies)*
98.1 WUDR Dayton (College/variety)*
98.3 WKET Kettering (Campus/variety)*
99.1 WHKO Dayton (Country)
99.9 WCHD Kettering (Contemporary hit radio)
100.7 WEEC Springfield (Worship music)*
101.5 WCLI-FM Enon (Country)
102.9 WDHT Urbana (Mainstream urban)
103.5 WGRR Hamilton (Classic hits)
103.9 WZDA Beavercreek (Country)
104.7 WTUE Dayton (Classic rock)
105.9 WNKN Middletown (Classic country)
106.5 WTKD Greenville (Christian)
106.9 WWSU Fairborn (College/variety)*
107.1 WTJN-LP Troy (LPFM/community)*
107.7 WMMX Dayton (Hot AC)

References

Dayton